Muhammad Subuh Sumohadiwidjojo (born June 22, 1901, in Kedungjati, near Semarang, Java, Dutch East Indies; died June 23, 1987)  was an Indonesian who founded the movement known as Subud.
As a young man Muhammad Subuh claims to have received a series of intense experiences that he believed gave him contact with a spiritual energy from a higher power. By the 1930s, he believed that it was his task to transmit this energy - which he called latihan kejiwaan (Indonesian for "spiritual exercise") - to others, but that he was not to seek people out but simply to wait for those who asked for it.

In 1956, Pak Subuh, or "Bapak" as he was called by members of Subud (the word "Bapak" is Indonesian for something akin to father), was invited to England by J. G. Bennett, where many Westerners joined Subud. He was then asked to go to other countries such as the United States and Australia. In this way, Subud spread rapidly around the world.

When he died in 1987 he left many talks on tape, video and in print, which Subud uses to guide the organization he founded.

Biography 

Muhammad Subuh wrote in his autobiography that, about the year 1932, he had a visionary visit to the highest heaven, the "Seventh Heaven".
By his account, one night he felt drowsy and went to lie down in bed. Instead of falling asleep, he felt himself "lengthen, widen and expand into a sphere" and then entered a great space. He saw a group of stars far away and was told that it was the universe he had left behind. He then traveled at great speed through a great expanse and beyond, there were seven (7) "mountain-like cones of light, one stacked upon another". He described how he entered the cones of light one after another until he entered the seventh, the last. Then he returned to earth and saw what looked like stars in the sky but later realized they were the lights of Semarang, the hometown where he lived. He even tarried a little over the rooftop of his own house trying to lift up some roof tiles with his fingers but instead found himself inside his own room. It was about the time of Subuh or dawn.
 
In his description Muhammad Subuh implied the seventh cone of light represents the highest heaven. It is likely because of this description of his ascension that Muhammad Subuh insisted that his autobiography be published only after his death though it was completed much earlier.

From his first visit to Britain in 1957 until his death 30 years later in 1987, Muhammad Subuh is estimated to have travelled 594,320 miles outside Indonesia, visiting Subud groups around the world. On these trips he gave explanations about the nature of the Latihan spiritual exercise and the purpose and meaning of the spiritual association of Subud. Approximately 1,400 of these talks were recorded, with provisional translations to English made available at the time. These talks are currently being re-translated and republished by Subud Publications International. There are now Subud groups in over 70 countries, with a worldwide membership of about 10,000.

In Indonesia itself, very little literature is available on Subuh, and therefore very few people have knowledge about Subuh or the movement he founded.

Works

References

External links 
 Subud Publications International Organisation dedicated to translating and publishing talks by Muhammad Subuh Sumohadiwidjojo

1901 births
1987 deaths
Subud
Indonesian Subud members
Founders of new religious movements